Notre Dame Fighting Irish football rivalries refers to rivalries of the University of Notre Dame in the sport of college football. Because the Notre Dame Fighting Irish are independent of a football conference, they play a national schedule, which annually includes historic rivals University of Southern California and Navy, more recent rival Stanford, and five games with ACC teams.

Current annual rivalries

USC

Notre Dame's main rival is the University of Southern California. The Notre Dame–USC football rivalry has been played annually since 1926, except from 1943 to 1945 and 2020, and is regarded as the greatest intersectional series in college football. The winner of the annual rivalry game is awarded the coveted Jeweled Shillelagh, a war club adorned with emerald-emblazoned clovers signifying Fighting Irish victories and Ruby-emblazoned Trojan warrior heads for Trojan wins. When the original shillelagh ran out of space for the Trojan heads and shamrocks after the 1989 game, it was retired and is permanently displayed at Notre Dame. A new shillelagh was introduced for the 1997 season. Through the 2017 season, Notre Dame leads the series 47–37–5.

The origin of the series is quite often recounted as a "conversation between wives" of Notre Dame head coach Knute Rockne and USC athletic director Gywnn Wilson. In fact, many sports writers often cite this popular story as the main reason the two schools decided to play one another. As the story goes, the rivalry began with USC looking for a national rival. USC dispatched Wilson and his wife to Lincoln, Nebraska, where Notre Dame was playing Nebraska on Thanksgiving Day. On that day (Nebraska 17, Notre Dame 0) Knute Rockne resisted the idea of a home-and-home series with USC because of the travel involved, but Mrs. Wilson was able to persuade Mrs. Rockne that a trip every two years to sunny Southern California was better than one to snowy, hostile Nebraska. Mrs. Rockne spoke to her husband and on December 4, 1926, USC became an annual fixture on Notre Dame's schedule.

However, several college football historians, including Murray Sperber, have uncovered evidence that somewhat contradicts this story. Of the most contradictory parts is the idea that Rockne was resistant to playing out west. Sperber documents that USC offered to play Notre Dame back in 1925 at the Rose Bowl. Notre Dame ultimately played Stanford that year because they were the Pacific Coast Conference champs. But due to the large alumni support for an annual season ending game in Los Angeles and the still existing interest for a home-and-home series, Notre Dame and USC started playing the series the following year in 1926. The series creation was also likely aided by USC coach Howard Jones, whom Rockne recommended USC hire due to their long friendship.

Since 1961, the game has alternated between Notre Dame Stadium in South Bend in mid-October and the Los Angeles Memorial Coliseum, which serves as USC's home field, in late November. Originally the game was played in both locations in late November, but because of poor weather during that time of the year at South Bend, USC insisted on having the game moved to October in 1961.

The 2020 game, scheduled to be played in Los Angeles on Saturday November 28, was canceled because of the COVID-19 pandemic, along with all other non-conference games involving Pac-12 schools. Notre Dame's rivalry games with Navy and Stanford were also canceled.

Navy

The Navy–Notre Dame series was played annually between 1927 and 2019, which was the longest uninterrupted intersectional series in college football.  The 2020 game was canceled due to the COVID-19 pandemic, though the series resumed in 2021.

Before Navy won a 46–44 triple-overtime thriller in 2007, Notre Dame had a 43-game winning streak that was the longest series win streak between two annual opponents in the history of Division I FBS football. Navy's previous win came in 1963, 35–14 with future Heisman Trophy winner and NFL QB Roger Staubach at the helm. Navy had come close to winning on numerous occasions before 2007. They subsequently won again in 2009, 2010, and 2016.

Despite the one-sided result the last few decades, most Notre Dame and Navy fans consider the series a sacred tradition for historical reasons. Both schools have strong football traditions going back to the beginnings of the sport. Notre Dame, like many colleges, faced severe financial difficulties during World War II. The US Navy made Notre Dame a training center and paid enough for usage of the facilities to keep the University afloat. Notre Dame has since extended an open invitation for Navy to play the Fighting Irish in football and considers the game annual repayment on a debt of honor. The series is marked by mutual respect, as evidenced by each team standing at attention during the playing of the other's alma mater after the game, a tradition that started in 2005. Navy's athletic director, on renewing the series through 2016, remarked "...it is of great interest to our collective national audience of Fighting Irish fans, Naval Academy alumni, and the Navy family at large." The series is scheduled to continue indefinitely; renewals are a mere formality.

Shortly before the start of the 2014 season, ESPN polled the head coaches in the so-called "Power Five" football conferences, plus Notre Dame's Brian Kelly, as to whether they would favor a schedule consisting only of "Power 5" opponents. Kelly was adamantly opposed to such a requirement if it meant taking Navy off the schedule, specifically calling a potential loss of the Navy game "a deal-breaker."

The series is a "home and home" series with the schools alternating the home team. Due to the relatively small size of the football stadium in Annapolis, the two teams have never met there. Instead, Navy usually hosts the game at larger facilities such as Baltimore's old Memorial Stadium or current M&T Bank Stadium, FedExField in Landover, Maryland, Veterans Stadium and later Lincoln Financial Field in Philadelphia, or at Giants Stadium in East Rutherford, New Jersey. During the 1960s, the Midshipmen hosted the game at John F. Kennedy Memorial Stadium in Philadelphia. In 1996 the game was played at Croke Park in Dublin, Ireland. The game returned to Dublin in 2012, where the Aviva Stadium hosted the event won by Notre Dame 50–10. The game was also occasionally played at old Cleveland Stadium. The game will return to Ireland in 2023, to make up for the 2020 game cancellation due to Covid-19’s travel restrictions. This game will also be played at Dublin’s Aviva Stadium. 

In years when Navy hosts (even-numbered), it is one of few non-Southeastern Conference games aired on CBS. In years when Notre Dame hosts (odd-numbered), it is carried on NBC as are other Notre Dame home games. As of 2020, the rights to Navy football games have been picked up by ESPN, and it will air subsequent Navy-Notre Dame games.

Stanford

The Fighting Irish have a rivalry with the Stanford Cardinal for the Legends Trophy, a combination of Fighting Irish crystal with California redwood. The two teams first met in the 1925 Rose Bowl, then played each other in 1942 and again in 1963–64. The modern series began in 1988 when Notre Dame sought out a school to play out west over Thanksgiving weekend during the years that USC plays in South Bend. The series has been played annually except in 1995–96. The rivalry has become more competitive in recent years, during the tenures of Stanford coaches Jim Harbaugh and David Shaw. Notre Dame and Stanford are regularly ranked in the U.S. News & World Report top 20 best colleges in America, and both share a mission to develop student athletes that can compete in the classroom and on the football field. As a result, both schools often compete for similar types of athletes in recruiting. Notre Dame leads the series 19–11. When the game is played in Palo Alto, it is usually the last game on Stanford's schedule (as has been the case since 1999), one week after the Cardinal plays archrival Cal in The Big Game. All but two of the games in South Bend have been played in October; the only exceptions, in 2010 and 2018, were on the last Saturday of September.

The 2020 game, scheduled to be played in South Bend on Saturday October 10, was canceled because of the COVID-19 pandemic, along with all other non-conference games involving Pac-12 schools. Notre Dame's rivalry games with USC and Navy were also canceled.

Historical rivalries
Notre Dame has traditionally played Division I FBS football independent from any conference affiliation. In its early years joining a conference, in particular the geographically-contiguous Big Ten Conference, would have provided stability and scheduling opportunities. Conferences have periodically approached Notre Dame about joining, most notably the Big Ten in 1999. Notre Dame elected to keep its independent status in football feeling that it has contributed to Notre Dame's unique place in college football lore. Subsequently, Notre Dame joined the ACC for other sports and agreed to 5 football games with ACC teams per year. The following is a list of historical rivalries in order of games played and a synopsis of each series history.

Purdue

This in-state rivalry began in 1896. From 1946 to 2014, the Fighting Irish played  Purdue Boilermakers every year without interruption. The series is scheduled to resume on a non-annual basis in 2021 with Notre Dame leading the series 58–26–2. The two teams play for the Shillelagh Trophy. The series has been marked by a number of key upsets. Purdue ended Notre Dame's 39-game unbeaten streak in 1950 and posted upsets in 1954, 1967 and 1974. They also hold the record for the most points scored in one game by an opponent in Notre Dame Stadium with 51 in 1960. In addition, Purdue holds records for the most points scored against Notre Dame in the first (24 in 1974) and second quarters (31 in 1960). On September 28, 1968, #1 Purdue defeated #2 Notre Dame 37–22 behind the effort of Leroy Keyes, a two-way player for the Boilermakers. It was the eleventh 1 vs 2 game (and the sixth involving Notre Dame).

Michigan State

Notre Dame also has a rivalry with Michigan State University that began in 1897. From 1959 to 2013 the Fighting Irish played Michigan State every year without interruption, except for a two-year hiatus in 1995 and 1996. The next scheduled game is in 2026. The 1966 Notre Dame vs. Michigan State football game is regarded as one of the Games of the Century and is still talked about to this day because of its ending - a 10–10 tie. Since polls began in 1936, this game marked the 10th matchup that paired the #1 team against the #2 team, with Notre Dame having been involved in five of these ten games up to that point. Notre Dame leads the series 48–28–1.

Pittsburgh

The Fighting Irish's longtime series with the Pittsburgh Panthers, Notre Dame's fifth most played football opponent, began in 1909, and there have been no more than two consecutive seasons without two teams meeting each other except between 1913 and 1929, 1938–42, and 1979–81. Since 1982, the Panthers have remained a relative fixture on the schedule. Notre Dame leads the series 49–21–1. The longest game in Notre Dame history occurred between the two schools in 2008, when Pitt defeated ND in a record 4 overtimes by a field goal. The 2012 contest saw Notre Dame erase a 20–6 deficit in the fourth quarter and force overtime. The Irish won 29–26 in triple overtime after the Panthers narrowly missed a game-winning field goal in the second overtime. In 2013 both schools joined the ACC (Pitt for all sports including football, and Notre Dame for non-football sports), which led to the schools playing at least once every three years. Their ACC matches began in 2013 in Pittsburgh with a 28–21 Panthers win; the most recent game was a 45-3 Irish win in 2020.

Army

While Notre Dame and Army aren't exactly rivals in a modern sense, it was Army that helped Notre Dame gain a national following by agreeing to schedule them during the Rockne years while Notre Dame was boycotted by the Big Ten. The first Army–Notre Dame matchup in 1913 is generally regarded as the game that put the Fighting Irish on the college football map. In that game, Notre Dame revolutionized the forward pass in a stunning 35–13 victory. For years it was "The Game" on Notre Dame's schedule, played at the first Yankee Stadium in New York.

During the 1940s, the rivalry with the U.S. Military Academy Cadets (now Black Knights) reached its zenith. This was because both teams were extremely successful and met several times in key games (including one of the Games of the Century, a scoreless tie in the 1946 Army vs. Notre Dame football game). In 1944, the Cadets administered the worst defeat in Notre Dame football history, crushing the Fighting Irish 59–0. The following year, it was more of the same, a 48–0 blitzkrieg. The 1947 game was played in South Bend for the first time and the Fighting Irish prevailed, 27–7. The annual game then went on hiatus for 10 years, after occurring every year since 1919.

Since then, there have been infrequent meetings over the past several decades, with Army's last win coming in 1958. Like Navy, due to the small capacity of Army's Michie Stadium, the Black Knights would play their home games at a neutral site, which for a number of years was Yankee Stadium and before that, the Polo Grounds. In 1957, the game was played in Philadelphia's Municipal (later John F. Kennedy Memorial) Stadium while in 1965, the teams met at Shea Stadium in New York. They last met at Yankee Stadium in 2010. The 1973 contest was played at West Point with the Fighting Irish prevailing, 62–3. In more recent times, games in which Army was the host have been played at Giants Stadium in East Rutherford, New Jersey.

Notre Dame leads the series 39–8–4, most recently defeating Army 44–6 at the Alamodome in San Antonio in 2016.

Northwestern

It began in 1889, one of the oldest in Fighting Irish football annals. It has been suggested that the nickname, "Fighting Irish," originated during that first meeting when Northwestern fans chanted, "Kill those Irish! Kill those fighting Irish!" at halftime. Northwestern and Notre Dame had a yearly contest from 1929 to 1948, with the winner taking home a shillelagh, much like the winner of the Notre Dame–USC contest now receives. The Northwestern-Notre Dame shillelagh was largely forgotten by the early 1960s. Northwestern ended the series after 1948, as did several other schools who were getting tired of being beaten year in and year out by Notre Dame, and the two schools would not meet again until 1959. By then, Ara Parseghian was coaching the Wildcats, who notched four consecutive victories over Notre Dame between 1959 and 1962. After Ara came to Notre Dame, he posted a 9–0 docket against his old team. In fact, the Fighting Irish did not lose to Northwestern again until September 1995, which was the beginning of a Rose Bowl season for the Wildcats and the two teams' last meeting for nearly 20 years. The series was renewed in 2014 when the Wildcats traveled to South Bend for the first time since 1995, defeating the Irish 43–40 in overtime. The Irish repaid the visit in 2018 when they traveled to Evanston and defeated Wildcats 31–21. Notre Dame leads the series 38–9–2.

Michigan

Notre Dame and Michigan first played in 1887 in Notre Dame's introduction to football. The Wolverines proceeded to win the first eight contests, before losing in 1909, the final game in the series until 1942, when the Wolverines defeated the Fighting Irish. On October 9, 1943, top-ranked Notre Dame defeated second-ranked Michigan in the first matchup of top teams since the institution of the AP Poll in 1936. The rivalry then froze at 11 games played until 1978, when it launched an evenly matched 15–15–1 run through 2014 (skipping only 1983–84, 1995–96, and 2000–01).  In the aftermath of Notre Dame's 5 game ACC schedule and Michigan's expanded Big 10 schedule, the series was put on a three-year hiatus after the 2014 game, a 31-0 Notre Dame victory. The series resumed in South Bend in 2018, and saw Michigan rout the Irish 45-14 in Ann Arbor in 2019. The rivalry is heightened by the two schools' competitive leadership atop the college football all-time winning percentage board, as well as its competition for the same type of student-athletes. Michigan leads the series 24-18-1.

Boston College

Boston College is considered to be a rival with Notre Dame based on both institutions' connection to the Roman Catholic Church. The Fighting Irish and Boston College Eagles first met in 1975 in Dan Devine's debut as head coach. They met in the 1983 Liberty Bowl and during the regular season in 1987, then played each other annually from 1992 to 2004. The Fighting Irish and Eagles play for the Frank Leahy Memorial Bowl and Ireland Trophy. The matchup has become relatively popular and gained several nicknames including the "Holy War", "The Bingo Bowl" and "The Celtic Bowl". In 1993, the Eagles ruined Notre Dame's undefeated season with a 41–39 victory on a 41-yard field goal by David Gordon as time ran out, overshadowing a furious comeback from a 38–17 fourth quarter deficit by Notre Dame. Notre Dame leads the series 17–9, winning the last eight after the Eagles won the prior six meetings. The series was scheduled to end after the 2010 season due in part to BC's move to the ACC; however, it was renewed in 2010. With Notre Dame's move to the ACC, they will continue to meet at least semi-regularly. The first meeting after Notre Dame's arrival in the ACC was held at Fenway Park in 2015 as part of Notre Dame's Shamrock Series, with the Irish winning 19–16; the next was in 2017 with Notre Dame winning 49–20. Notre Dame prevailed in 2020 by a score against BC of 45–31.

Miami (FL)
Notre Dame and the Miami Hurricanes first met during the 1955 college football season. They met three times during the 1960s (1960, 1965 and 1967), and proceeded to play each other annually from 1971 to 1990 (except in 1986). Notre Dame consistently dominated the series in the 1970s, but in the 1980s, Miami began to dominate as the once docile rivalry intensified significantly. Both teams were national contenders in the later part of the decade, and both teams cost each other at least one national championship. Hostilities were fueled when the Hurricanes routed the Fighting Irish in the 1985 season finale 58–7, with Miami widely accused of running up the score in the second half. The rivalry gained national attention and both teams played their most famous games from 1988 to 1990. The infamous game known as Catholics vs. Convicts was won by the Fighting Irish 31–30, with Miami ending Notre Dame's record 23-game winning streak the following year, 27–10. The rivalry ended after the Fighting Irish dashed #2 Miami's hopes for a repeat national championship with a 29–20 victory in South Bend. Notre Dame dropped Miami from its schedule due to the intensified rivalry.  

The Fighting Irish and Hurricanes met again 20 years later, in the 2010 Sun Bowl in El Paso, Texas, where Notre Dame defeated Miami 33–17. In 2012, the teams met again and Fighting Irish defeated the Hurricanes 41–3 at Soldier Field during its annual Shamrock Series, but that victory was later vacated for ND's use of ineligible players. Notre Dame leads the series 17–8–1. The teams met most recently in 2017, with Miami winning 41–8. 

The two teams are next scheduled to play at yet to be determined date in the 2024 season at Notre Dame. Future games are also scheduled between the two teams at yet to be determined dates in the 2025, 2031, 2032, 2034, and 2037 seasons.

Significant series
The following is a list of other significant series in order of games played and a synopsis of each series history.

Florida State
Notre Dame and Florida State have met eleven times, first when both were strong independents and now as part of Notre Dame's commitment to scheduling ACC schools.  This series began in South Bend, in 1981. Florida State won 19–13. Notre Dame won the second contest, however, in 1993, in South Bend, by a score of 31–24. The contest was referred to by some as "The Game of the Century." Florida State was, at the time, ranked #1 and Notre Dame was ranked #2. Although Notre Dame beat FSU again, in Tallahassee, in 2002 (by a score of 34–24), Florida State then won five of the next six meetings (1994, 1995, 2003, 2011, 2014), including two bowl victories (the January 1996 Orange Bowl and the 2011 Champs Sports Bowl). But Notre Dame rebounded with three straights wins with two convincing victories in South Bend (2018 and 2020) and an overtime thriller in Tallahassee (2021). The two teams are currently scheduled to meet again, during the regular season in 2024. Florida State leads the series 6–5.

Georgia Tech
This series began in 1922. The Yellow Jackets were a longtime rival of the Fighting Irish and the two teams met periodically on an annual basis over the years, particularly from 1963 to 1981 when both schools were independents following Tech's departure from the Southeastern Conference.  The 1975 Georgia Tech-Notre Dame game marked the sole appearance in an Irish uniform of Rudy Ruettiger, the subject of the film Rudy.  When Georgia Tech joined the Atlantic Coast Conference beginning in 1982, they were forced to end the series after 1981 because of scheduling difficulties. Consequently, the two teams have met very infrequently since then. Georgia Tech was the opponent in the inaugural game in the newly expanded Notre Dame Stadium in 1997, then a year later they met again in the Gator Bowl. The Fighting Irish and Yellow Jackets met in the 2006 and 2007 season openers and split both games. Notre Dame leads the series 29–6–1. The rivalry resumed in 2015 with a 30–22 Irish win in South Bend, and will continue on a semi-regular basis thereafter, due to Notre Dame's current commitment to scheduling several ACC opponents each season.

Nebraska
The Fighting Irish and Nebraska Cornhuskers first met in 1915 and played each other annually through 1925. During the years of Notre Dame's famed Four Horsemen backfield from 1922 to 1924, the Fighting Irish compiled a record of 27–2–1, with their only losses coming to Nebraska in Lincoln (1922 and 1923). The Fighting Irish won in 1924 in South Bend and Nebraska won in 1925 in Lincoln, evening up the series at 5–5–1 (the 0–0 tie occurring in 1918). The Huskers were replaced on Notre Dame's schedule with USC. They met twice during the Frank Leahy era in 1947 and 1948 (with the Fighting Irish winning 31–0 and 44–13, respectively) and squared off in the 1973 Orange Bowl, a game in which the Huskers handed the Fighting Irish their worst defeat under Ara Parseghian, 40–6. More recently, there was a home-and-home series in 2000–01 (with the Huskers winning 27–24 and 27–10, respectively). The 2000 game was a memorable one, as #1 Nebraska escaped defeat in overtime on a touchdown run by Eric Crouch. Nebraska leads the series 8–7–1.

Penn State
Notre Dame and Penn State first met in 1913. After subsequent games in 1925, 1926 and 1928, the two schools would not meet again until the 1976 Gator Bowl, by which time an annual home-and-home series beginning in 1981 had been agreed upon. The Fighting Irish held a 4–0–1 edge going into 1981, but Penn State won 6 of the next 7. The coaches were one source of the rivalry. Lou Holtz and Joe Paterno were both long serving and successful coaches. Their friendly rivalry helped expand the Notre Dame–Penn State rivalry to new dimensions. The series ended after the 1992 season, coinciding with formerly independent Penn State's affiliation with the Big Ten. It had been scheduled to continue through 1994 and Notre Dame approached Penn State about extending it even further, but Penn State's admittance to the Big Ten in 1990 made it more difficult to fit the games on the schedule. However, the Fighting Irish and Nittany Lions recent successes and other factors led to the renewal of the rivalry in 2006–07, in which the teams split both games. The series is tied 9–9–1.

References

Army Black Knights football
Boston College Eagles football
Florida State Seminoles football
Georgia Tech Yellow Jackets football
Michigan Wolverines football
Michigan State Spartans football
Navy Midshipmen football
Nebraska Cornhuskers football
North Carolina Tar Heels football
Northwestern Wildcats football
Notre Dame Fighting Irish football
Pittsburgh Panthers football
Purdue Boilermakers football
Stanford Cardinal football
USC Trojans football